Star of the North is a 1914 American silent short adventure film directed by Thomas H. Ince and Jay Hunt. Sessue Hayakawa, Tsuru Aoki, J. Frank Burke, Herschel Mayall and Ernest Swallow played important roles in the film.

References

External links 

 

1914 films
American adventure films
American black-and-white films
American silent short films
Films directed by Thomas H. Ince
1914 adventure films
1910s American films
Silent adventure films